Posht Par or Poshtpar or Posht-e Par may refer to:

Posht Par, Mamasani, Fars Province
Posht-e Par, Sarvestan, Fars Province
Posht Par, Khuzestan
Posht Par Rural District